Sir Maurice Oldfield  (16 November 1915 – 11 March 1981) was a British intelligence officer and espionage administrator. He served as the seventh director of the Secret Intelligence Service (MI6), from 1973 to 1978.

Early life
Oldfield was born on 16 November 1915 at his grandmother's farm just outside Youlgrave, a village in Derbyshire. He grew up at a house called Mona View in Over Haddon. He was the first of 11 children of Joseph Oldfield, tenant farmer, and his wife, Ada Annie Dicken.

He was educated at Lady Manners School at the nearby market town of Bakewell, before winning a scholarship to the Victoria University of Manchester, where he stayed at Hulme Hall. There, he studied under the historian A. J. P. Taylor and specialised in medieval history. He graduated with a first class degree and was elected to a fellowship.

Intelligence career

During the Second World War, Oldfield joined the British Army. Initially a sergeant in Army Field Security (which was absorbed into the Intelligence Corps in 1940), he was commissioned as a second lieutenant in the Intelligence Corps in July 1943. Most of his wartime service was in Egypt at the headquarters of SIME (Security Intelligence Middle East) in Cairo. This was primarily a counter-intelligence organisation, the role of which was to detect hostile agents in the region and counter their activities.

By the end of the war, Oldfield had been promoted to major. In 1946, he was awarded an MBE.

After the war, Oldfield joined the Secret Intelligence Service (SIS), commonly known as MI6. From 1947 to 1949, he was deputy to Brigadier Douglas Roberts, the head of counter-intelligence, with whom he had served in Egypt during the war. After two postings to Singapore (the first as deputy head, the second as head of the SIS regional headquarters) he was appointed a CBE. From 1959, he spent four years as the SIS representative in Washington, D.C. This was a key post, important for the maintenance of good relations between the SIS and the Central Intelligence Agency. On his return, he became director of counter-intelligence and deputy to the Chief of the Secret Intelligence Service Sir Dick White. Oldfield was passed over for promotion when Sir John Rennie succeeded White in 1968. He eventually became director when Rennie resigned in 1973; he held this post until his retirement in 1978.

Retirement

After retiring from the MI6, Oldfield was a visiting fellow at All Souls College, Oxford until 1979. Oldfield lived at Marsham Court, an apartment building in Millbank in the City of Westminster from the early 1970s until his death in 1981. A large explosive device was discovered by officers from Special Branch hanging on railings outside Marsham Court on 13 October 1975. The bomb was near Lockett's restaurant which was directly under Oldfield's flat.
 
In 1979 the new prime minister, Margaret Thatcher, asked Oldfield to coordinate security and intelligence in Northern Ireland.

After his retirement as Chief of the SIS, it emerged that Oldfield was homosexual, resulting in his security clearance being withdrawn shortly before his death in 1981.

Oldfield died in March 1981, aged 66. He is buried next to his parents and sister in St Anne's churchyard, Over Haddon, Derbyshire.

Legacy

Oldfield was reputedly one of the models for John le Carré's fictional character George Smiley, though Le Carré disputes this. In his memoir The Pigeon Tunnel: Stories from My Life Le Carré describes a lunchtime meeting between Oldfield, himself and Alec Guinness; this was intended to provide the actor with a sense of the manner and appearance of an "old spy in retirement".

In October 2012, it was reported by the BBC's current affairs programme Panorama, that he had been linked to the Elm Guest House child abuse scandal, supposedly involving senior MPs and security personnel, by the Operation Midland investigation, and a Metropolitan Police informant. The investigation ended without charges, and in 2017 Oldfield was cleared of all allegations of child abuse at Elm Guest House and elsewhere. The accuser in the Operation Midland case, Carl Beech, was subsequently convicted of making up the allegations in 2019.

References
Citations

Bibliographies
 Deacon, Richard (1985) 'C': a biography of Sir Maurice Oldfield. London: Macdonald

External links
Oxford Dictionary of National Biography index entry; Oldfield, Maurice; 2004

1915 births
1981 deaths
British Army personnel of World War II
Cold War spies
Alumni of the University of Manchester
Commanders of the Order of the British Empire
Knights Grand Cross of the Order of St Michael and St George
Intelligence Corps officers
English LGBT people
Chiefs of the Secret Intelligence Service
People from Bakewell
People from Derbyshire Dales (district)
People of The Troubles (Northern Ireland)
Intelligence Corps soldiers
Burials in Derbyshire
Gay men